Otto Michael Ludwig Leichtenstern (14 October 1845 – 23 February 1900) was a German internist born in Ingolstadt.

In 1869 he received his doctorate from the University of Munich, later working as an assistant of clinical medicine in Munich under Karl von Pfeufer (1806–1869) and Joseph von Lindwurm (1824–1874). After the death of Felix von Niemeyer (1820–1871), he served as interim head of the medical clinic in Tübingen prior to the appointment of Carl von Liebermeister (1833–1901) as Niemeyer's permanent replacement. Leichtenstern remained at the Tübingen clinic for several years, afterwards serving as head physician of internal medicine at the city hospital in Cologne (1879–1900).

Leichtenstern is remembered for publishing articles on almost every facet of medicine. In the field of helminthology, he made contributions in his investigations of hookworm (Ancylostoma duodenale).

In 1898 he suspected that the compound 2-naphthylamine (2-NA) was involved in human bladder tumorigenesis. With Adolph Strümpell (1853–1925), the eponymous "Strümpell-Leichtenstern encephalitis" is named, a disease also known as acute hemorrhagic encephalitis.

References 
 Otto Michael Ludwig Leichtenstern at Who Named It
  Medscape.com Chemical Carcinogens—From Past to Present.

19th-century German physicians
German internists
1900 deaths
1845 births
Academic staff of the University of Tübingen
Ludwig Maximilian University of Munich alumni
People from Ingolstadt